Matthew John Maguire (born 30 May 1984) is a former professional Australian rules footballer who played with the St Kilda Football Club and the Brisbane Lions in the Australian Football League (AFL).

AFL career

St Kilda Football Club
Maguire played in St Kilda's 2004 Wizard Home Loans Cup winning side, the club's second pre-season cup win.

In 2006 a serious leg injury halted his season. During the final moments of the St Kilda vs West Coast Eagles game in Round 18, Maguire collided with Tyson Stenglein causing a break to both his tibia and fibula. His injury was likened to that of Richmond's Nathan Brown, but it was soon revealed to be less severe. In the days following the incident, Maguire had a rod inserted into his leg and the club was optimistic he could make his comeback (without any complications) as soon as Round 1, 2007. But soon after Maguire was diagnosed with Compartment syndrome and required a further eight operations to relieve him of the pain and swelling. He suffered complications with compartment syndrome in his calf and spent 21 days in hospital. Doctors had to cut into his calf numerous times to clear the build-up of blood, with ever-increasing difficulty in repairing the wound.

Maguire made his return to the AFL in Round 1 of the 2007 season only to be further sidelined with stress fractures in his foot. He returned once again in the Saints' Round 14 loss against Collingwood and although he played out the remainder of the year it was clear that he was a shadow of his former self. At the end of the 2007 season it was revealed that after experiencing soreness during training he had once again suffered stress fractures in his foot, preventing him from participating in the majority of the Saint's pre-season.

After finally returning in Round 4 in 2008, Maguire suffered another injury in Round 7 in a St Kilda vs Richmond game. Once again he injured his left foot and this effectively sidelined him until the end of the 2008 AFL season. He had surgery to repair a fracture to the fourth metatarsal, one of the long bones that connects the middle of the foot to the base of the toes.

The St Kilda football manager, Matthew Drain, said that although Maguire most likely would not return in 2009 this may be the best chance of him getting everything right without the pressure of playing and may turn out to be the best thing for him in the long run.

Maguire spent most of the 2009 season playing for St Kilda's VFL affiliate the Sandringham Zebras.

As of the end of the 2009 season Maguire had played in four AFL finals and one pre-season cup final.

Maguire was delisted from the St Kilda playing list on 29 October 2009.

Brisbane Lions
On 26 November 2009 the Brisbane Lions selected Maguire in the draft at pick number 91. He was given jumper number 36 which was previously worn by Daniel Bradshaw. Maguire played his 100th AFL game in Round 1 of the 2010 season for the Brisbane Lions against the West Coast Eagles.

Maguire retired on 23 June 2015 after ongoing effects of a concussion he suffered in a NEAFL game two months prior.

Statistics

|- style="background-color: #EAEAEA"
! scope="row" style="text-align:center" | 2002
|style="text-align:center;"|
| 31 || 12 || 2 || 1 || 56 || 20 || 76 || 29 || 12 || 0.2 || 0.1 || 4.7 || 1.7 || 6.3 || 2.4 || 1.0
|-
! scope="row" style="text-align:center" | 2003
|style="text-align:center;"|
| 31 || 17 || 6 || 6 || 90 || 44 || 134 || 46 || 40 || 0.4 || 0.4 || 5.3 || 2.6 || 7.9 || 2.7 || 2.4
|- style="background-color: #EAEAEA"
! scope="row" style="text-align:center" | 2004
|style="text-align:center;"|
| 31 || 17 || 1 || 0 || 136 || 60 || 196 || 71 || 30 || 0.1 || 0.0 || 8.0 || 3.5 || 11.5 || 4.2 || 1.8
|-
! scope="row" style="text-align:center" | 2005
|style="text-align:center;"|
| 31 || 21 || 6 || 6 || 188 || 88 || 276 || 99 || 22 || 0.3 || 0.3 || 9.0 || 4.2 || 13.1 || 4.7 || 1.1
|- style="background-color: #EAEAEA"
! scope="row" style="text-align:center" | 2006
|style="text-align:center;"|
| 31 || 18 || 4 || 3 || 166 || 79 || 245 || 92 || 45 || 0.2 || 0.3 || 9.2 || 4.4 || 13.6 || 5.1 || 2.5
|-
! scope="row" style="text-align:center" | 2007
|style="text-align:center;"|
| 31 || 10 || 0 || 1 || 63 || 45 || 108 || 39 || 18 || 0.0 || 0.2 || 6.3 || 4.5 || 10.8 || 3.9 || 1.8
|- style="background-color: #EAEAEA"
! scope="row" style="text-align:center" | 2008
|style="text-align:center;"|
| 31 || 4 || 0 || 0 || 19 || 15 || 34 || 10 || 4 || 0.0 || 0.0 || 4.8 || 3.8 || 8.5 || 2.5 || 1.0
|-
! scope="row" style="text-align:center" | 2009
|style="text-align:center;"|
| 31 || 0 || — || — || — || — || — || — || — || — || — || — || — || — || — || —
|- style="background-color: #EAEAEA"
! scope="row" style="text-align:center" | 2010
|style="text-align:center;"|
| 36 || 14 || 0 || 1 || 137 || 85 || 222 || 86 || 40 || 0.0 || 0.1 || 9.8 || 6.1 || 15.9 || 6.1 || 2.9
|-
! scope="row" style="text-align:center" | 2011
|style="text-align:center;"|
| 36 || 15 || 0 || 2 || 94 || 76 || 170 || 59 || 32 || 0.0 || 0.1 || 6.3 || 5.1 || 11.3 || 3.9 || 2.1
|- style="background-color: #EAEAEA"
! scope="row" style="text-align:center" | 2012
|style="text-align:center;"|
| 36 || 16 || 0 || 0 || 147 || 59 || 206 || 81 || 34 || 0.0 || 0.0 || 9.2 || 3.7 || 12.9 || 5.1 || 2.1
|-
! scope="row" style="text-align:center" | 2013
|style="text-align:center;"|
| 36 || 11 || 1 || 2 || 114 || 46 || 160 || 71 || 18 || 0.1 || 0.2 || 10.4 || 4.2 || 14.6 || 6.5 || 1.6
|- style="background-color: #EAEAEA"
! scope="row" style="text-align:center" | 2014
|style="text-align:center;"|
| 36 || 13 || 1 || 1 || 121 || 59 || 180 || 65 || 21 || 0.1 || 0.1 || 9.3 || 4.5 || 13.9 || 5.0 || 1.6
|-
! scope="row" style="text-align:center" | 2015
|style="text-align:center;"|
| 36 || 2 || 0 || 0 || 12 || 5 || 17 || 4 || 7 || 0.1 || 0.0 || 6.0 || 2.5 || 8.5 || 2.0 || 3.5
|- class="sortbottom"
! colspan=3| Career
! 170
! 21
! 23
! 1343
! 681
! 2024
! 752
! 323
! 0.1
! 0.1
! 7.9
! 4.0
! 11.9
! 4.4
! 1.9
|}

References

External links

1984 births
Living people
St Kilda Football Club players
Brisbane Lions players
People from Warrnambool
Australian rules footballers from Victoria (Australia)
Geelong Falcons players
St Joseph's Football Club players
South Warrnambool Football Club players